The Patrol Police Department  is the Department of the Ministry of Internal Affairs of Georgia, which represents the state body serving the civil society and ensuring the safety of each citizen.

Activity
 Protection of public state and order as well as responding the violations and any other possible threat, their avoidance and prevention;
 Protection of physical persons and legal entities from any illegal action as prescribed by the legislation of Georgia;
 Protection of the safety for the road traffic participants, supervision on observation the road traffic rules, carrying out the relevant measures for prevention of road accidents;
 Protection of the State border at the border check points and observation of border regime in compliance with the legislation.
 Combat illegal migration, its prevention, detection and elimination within the scopes of its competence.

Structural units
 Organizational Division;
 Financial Division;
 Informational – Duty Division; 
 Unified Service Center (Division),
 Border Management and Coordination Main Division;
 Monitoring Division;
Tbilisi Main Division;
Mtskheta-Mtianeti Main Division;
Kvemo Kartli Main Division;
Shida Kartli Main Division;
Samtskhe-Javakheti Main Division;
Kakheti Main Division;
Imereti Main Division;
Samegrelo and Zemo Svaneti Main Division;
Adjara Main Division;
Guria Main Division.

References 

Law enforcement agencies of Georgia (country)